Landrum can refer to:

People
 Bill Landrum (born 1957), American baseball player
 Dan Landrum (born 1961), American hammered dulcimer player
 Eugene M. Landrum (1891–1967), major general in the United States Army, noted for his exploits in both World War II and the Korean War
 John Gill Landrum (1810–1882), pastor at Mount Zion Baptist Church, early South Carolina secessionist
 John M. Landrum, (1815-1861) United States Representative
 Mary Beth Landrum, British-American statistician
 Phil Landrum (1907–1990), United States Representative and a primary sponsor of the Landrum-Griffin Act
 Rich Landrum (born 1946), American broadcaster best known for his late 1970s-early 1980s stint announcing professional wrestling for Jim Crockett Promotions
Teddy Joseph Von Nukem (born Ted Landrum, 1987–2023), American white nationalist and far-right extremist
 Landrum Bolling (1913-2018), American diplomat and educator

Places
 Landrum, South Carolina, a city in Spartanburg County

Other
 The Labor Management Reporting and Disclosure Act, also known as the Landrum-Griffin Act, a United States labor law passed by the Congress in 1959